Yoram Yovell (born: August 2, 1958) is an Israeli psychoanalyst, psychiatrist and brain researcher. He is a professor and heads the Brain Institute for Emotion Research at the School of Social Work at Haifa University.

Yovell is an expert in the field of the neurobiology of love and emotions. In addition to his academic work, Yovell hosts the talk show Sichat Nefesh (Heart to Heart) on the Israeli Educational Channel and has authored many popular books in Hebrew which consist of detailed accounts of psychotherapy sessions.

Background 
Yoram Yovell was born Yoram Leibowitz, the son of Yafa (née Hefetz) an Uri Leibowitz, a professor of neurobiology. His grandfather was the scientist and philosopher Yeshayahu Leibowitz. He grew up in a Jewish Orthodox family in the Old Katamon neighborhood in Jerusalem and attended high school near the Hebrew University. When Yovell was fourteen years old, his father passed away from cancer and he spent many days at his grandfather's house. Yovell served as an officer in the Artillery Corps. of the Israel Defense Forces and took part in the first Lebanon War as a commander of an outlook post in southern Lebanon. During his military service, he changed his family name to Yovell due to the persisting attachment to his grandfather's last name, Leibowitz.

Yovell studied medicine at the Hebrew University of Jerusalem, neurobiology at the Weizman Institute, and psychiatry at Columbia University. He is a faculty member at the Etingon Psychoanalytical Institute in Jerusalem and has worked for several years in Manhattan.

Yovell serves as head of the trauma field of study at the School for Social Work at the faculty for the study of welfare and health as well as heads the Institute for Brain and Emotion Research at the University of Haifa and lectures on psychopathology at the Hebrew University's Medical School and Psychology Department.

Since 2008, Yovell hosts a talk show on the Israeli Educational Channel entitled Sichat Nefesh (Heart to Heart) which consists of personal talks with well-known Israeli personalities who expose details and personal experiences some of which have been previously published in the media and others which have not been published throughout their careers.

In 2009, Yovell took part and hosted Eich Lehiyot Meusharim B'Shisha Sheurim (How to Become Happy in Six Lessons) on Israeli Channel 2 which was originally produced in 2005 and was delayed broadcast for fear of poor rating. The series received unexpected success with an average rating score of 20%.

In 2019, Yovell began his involvement for change in the political arena in Israel. He established the demonstration tent at Jerusalem's Independence Park during the twenty-one days which were left for the dissolvement of the 22nd Knesset.

In January 2021, Yovell joined the "New Economy Party" headed by Yaron Zelekha in light of the general elections which were held a few weeks later. On March 14, he backed away from his decision and retired from the party.

In 2021, Yovell hosted a three-part series entitled "Lev Shavur" (Broken Heart) on Israel's HOT 8 Channel.

Personal life 
Yovell is a father of two boys from his first marriage and a father of three daughters from his current spouse.

Books 

 Israel: Sichat Nefesh (Israel: Heart to Heart), Kinneret Publishing (2012)
 Sa'arat Nefesh (Internal Storm), Keshet Publishing (2001)
 Ma Zot Ahava (What Is Love?), Keshet Publishing (2001)
 Helena Al HaGag (Helena on the Roof), Miskal Publishing (1998)

External links

References 

Living people
Israeli neuroscientists
Columbia University alumni
Israeli psychiatrists
1958 births
People from Jerusalem